Kheyreh Masjed (also Romanized as Khīreh Masjed; also known as Kheyna Majīd and Khin Majid) is a village in Qurigol Rural District, in the Central District of Bostanabad County, East Azerbaijan Province, Iran. At the 2006 census, its population was 423, in 91 families.

References 

Populated places in Bostanabad County